African Lyon is a football club in Dar es Salaam, Tanzania. Currently they play in the top level of Tanzanian professional football, the Tanzanian Premier League, after winning the First Division League's Group A in the 2015/2016 season.

History
Founded on June 14, 2000, African Lyon FC is one of the top Football clubs in Tanzania, based in the capital city of Dar es Salaam. African Lyon plays in the top division of Tanzanian professional football league, the Tanzanian Premier League. The club is owned by Rahim Kangezi. In 2017 a minority stake of the club was purchased by Middle East-based sports media group, DANTANI, Inc. Sports under the banner of Dantani Football Group led by Omar Al Raisi.

Current squad

Officials

Management
 Owner: Rahim J Kangezi
 Chairman: Jay Kangezi
Vice Chairman: Omar Al Raisi
 Club Secretary: Ernest Brown
 Finance Director: Ibrahim Salim
 Manager: Salvatory Edward
 Media Officer: Dimo
 Logistics: Sheraly Abdallah
 Treasurer: Ibrahim Salim
 Non Executive Board Member Dr Prateek Kumar

Sports
 Head Coach: Kharid Adam Munisson
 Assistant Coach: Adam Kipatacho
 Goalkeeping Coach: Juma Bomba
 Physical Coach: George Ole
 Statistician:
 Opposition Analysis:

Medical
 Kit Manager: Saleh Hassan
 Team Doctor:
 Physio:

U-20 Squad

References

External links
 Official Site
 Official Forum

Football clubs in Tanzania
Association football clubs established in 2000
Sport in Dar es Salaam
2000 establishments in Tanzania